Ellesmere Rural is a civil parish in Shropshire, England.  It contains 75 listed buildings that are recorded in the National Heritage List for England.  Of these, eleven are at Grade II*, the middle of the three grades, and the others are at Grade II, the lowest grade.  The parish is mainly to the south, the west, and the northwest of the town of Ellesmere.  It contains a number of villages and smaller settlements, but is almost entirely rural.

Most of the listed buildings are houses, cottages, farmhouses and farm buildings, and many of these are timber framed, dating from the 15th, 16th and 17th centuries.  The Llangollen Canal runs through the parish, and many structures associated with this are listed, including bridges and a lock.  To the southeast of the town of Ellesmere is the maintenance yard of the canal, which is "the best-preserved canal workshop site in Britain", and which contains four Grade II* listed buildings.  The other listed buildings include churches, one with a medieval cross in the churchyard, a country house and associated structures, a road bridge, a milestone, and a telephone kiosk.


Key

Buildings

References

Citations

Sources

Lists of buildings and structures in Shropshire